Heterocetus is a dubious genus of extinct cetacean.

Species

Heterocetus brevifrons (van Beneden, 1872)
Heterocetus guiscardii Capellini, 1877
Heterocetus major Stefano, 1900
Heterocetus sprangii van Beneden, 1886

Misassigned species

Heterocetus affinis Van Beneden, 1880; now assigned to Parietobalaena as P. affinis

References

Prehistoric cetacean genera
Fossil taxa described in 1877
Nomina dubia
Neogene mammals of Europe